Lewis Clayton (8 June 1838 – 25 June 1917) was an Anglican bishop, the second bishop suffragan of Leicester from 1903 until 1912.

Life

Lewis Clayton was educated at King's College School and Emmanuel College, Cambridge. He was ordained in 1861 and his first post was as a curate at Holy Trinity, Halstead.

From 1866 to 1875 he was Vicar of Dallington, Northamptonshire and from 1875 to 1888 was vicar of St Margaret's Church in Leicester.

From 1887 he was a residentiary canon at Peterborough Cathedral before his elevation to the episcopate. His wife was a prominent campaigner for women's suffrage. He was appointed suffragan bishop of Leicester in 1903; he resigned the see (retaining his cathedral residential canonry) and became an assistant bishop of Peterborough (in retirement) in December 1912 until his death in 1917. He died on 25 June 1917. He is buried at the east end of the cathedral.

References

External links
Photo of Clayton

1838 births
People educated at King's College School, London
Alumni of Emmanuel College, Cambridge
Bishops suffragan of Leicester
20th-century Church of England bishops
1917 deaths